Hemas Holdings PLC is a diversified corporation with a focused interest in consumer, healthcare, and mobility. Hemas is a publicly listed company with over 5,400+ employees.

In 1948, Hemas started with a simple intent: to help families live healthfully. As of 2021, Hemas operates in Sri Lanka, Bangladesh, India and Myanmar, bringing healthful living to life through its offerings.

Over the past 70+ years, Hemas has created daily moments of joy through a portfolio of products and services that delights in its utilitarianism; practiced a more robust version of health that moves beyond the absence of illness; and championed a more inclusive world that celebrates equal opportunity, integration and harmony. These actions have enabled the Group to offer meaningful interventions to all the stakeholders they serve and to showcase Sri Lankan products on the world stage.

Today, Hemas is a publicly quoted company listed on the Colombo Stock Exchange with over 4,000 shareholders and is regarded as one of the most respected and transparent companies in Sri Lanka and Asia's Most Socially Responsible Company.

On 25 June 2020, Kasturi Chellaraja Wilson was appointed as the CEO of Hemas Holdings and will replace Steven Enderby as the CEO with effect from 1 October 2020 as a part of the company's succession plan. Kasturi also became the first female group CEO of a public quoted conglomerate in Sri Lanka. She was also appointed as the deputy CEO of Hemas Holdings and will resume her duties as the deputy CEO with effect from 1 July 2020.

On 15 December 2020, Hemas announced they will sell Serendib Hotels to LOLC Group for Rs. 792 million.

References

External links
 Hemas Holdings PLC Corporate website

Companies listed on the Colombo Stock Exchange
Conglomerate companies of Sri Lanka